Samuel Huntington (October 4, 1765 – June 8, 1817) was an American jurist who was the third governor of Ohio from 1808 to 1810.

Biography
Huntington was born in Coventry in the Colony of Connecticut. He was the nephew (and, later, the adopted son) of Samuel Huntington, the fourth President of the Continental Congress and first President of the United States in Congress Assembled under the Articles of Confederation.

Huntington studied at Dartmouth College until the end of his junior year. He then transferred to Yale College, from which he was graduated in 1785. He was admitted to the bar and began practicing law in Connecticut.  In 1801, he moved to Ohio with his wife, Hannah, and their young sons, settling in the tiny village of Cleveland.

Career
After serving as a Trumbull county delegate to the State's first constitutional convention, Huntington was selected as an associate justice of the Ohio Supreme Court and succeeded Return J. Meigs, Jr. as Chief Justice a year later. He served until being elected Governor in 1808. His tenure was stormy, with much controversy over the impeachment of two judges for upholding the principle of judicial review (Huntington would have been impeached as well had it not been being elected governor), the move of the state capital from Zanesville to Chillicothe, and the Tiffin Resolution, which terminated the terms of all sitting judges. Huntington did not stand for re-election, but instead ran for the U.S. Senate, losing to Thomas Worthington.

Huntington was also an active Freemason, and served as the second Grand Master of the Grand Lodge F.&A.M. of Ohio in 1809.

References

External links

 

1765 births
1817 deaths
Governors of Ohio
Ohio state senators
Justices of the Ohio Supreme Court
Politicians from Cleveland
Ohio Democratic-Republicans
Ohio Constitutional Convention (1802)
Democratic-Republican Party state governors of the United States
Yale University alumni
Masonic Grand Masters
19th-century American politicians
19th-century American judges
18th-century American lawyers
19th-century American lawyers
People from Coventry, Connecticut
Lawyers from Cleveland